Nikolay Ivanovich Kiselyov (born 29 November 1946) is a former Russian footballer and coach. In 2010, he managed FC Rusichi Oryol.

Career
He capped 14 times for USSR, playing the 1970 FIFA World Cup.

External links
Profile

1946 births
Living people
Russian footballers
Soviet footballers
Soviet Union international footballers
FC Spartak Moscow players
FC Zorya Luhansk players
1970 FIFA World Cup players
Soviet football managers
Russian football managers
FK Dinamo Samarqand managers
FC Urartu managers
FC Sokol Saratov managers
FC Metallurg Lipetsk managers
FC Oryol managers
Al Jazira Club managers
Association football midfielders
FC Iskra Smolensk players